Henry David López (born 8 August 1992) is a Guatemalan football forward who plays for Caracas of the Venezuelan Primera División.

Career

Club
López began his career in the youth ranks of Municipal, where he played from 2002 to 2009. During the 2010 season he was on the books of Real Maryland F.C. After a brief stay in the United States, López signed with Brazilian club EC Noroeste. However, visa problems affected his stay in Brazil.

On February 21, 2013, López signed on to play for New York Cosmos in the team's inaugural year in the NASL.

For the 2015-16 season, López decided to return to Guatemala and signed with Municipal. He scored 6 goals in his first 13 matches, finishing the season with a stat line of 8 goals in 30 matches, playing 54 minutes per game.

López signed with Caracas for the Torneo Clausura of the 2016 Season.

International
His game-winning goal in 2011 Under-20 World Cup Qualification against the United States qualified Guatemala to the 2011 U20 World Cup, in Colombia, Guatemala's debut World Cup appearance at any level.

He appeared for two matches on the Guatemala national football team for the 2011 CONCACAF Gold Cup.

References

External links

1992 births
Living people
Guatemalan footballers
Guatemalan expatriate footballers
Guatemala international footballers
Association football forwards
2011 CONCACAF Gold Cup players
Esporte Clube Noroeste players
New York Cosmos (2010) players
Expatriate footballers in Brazil
Expatriate soccer players in the United States
North American Soccer League players
Guatemalan expatriate sportspeople in the United States
Guatemalan expatriate sportspeople in Brazil
Sportspeople from Guatemala City
Guatemala under-20 international footballers
Guatemala youth international footballers